The 2007 WNBA season was the 11th for the Phoenix Mercury. The Mercury won their first WNBA championship.

Offseason

WNBA Draft
The following are the Mercury's selections in the 2007 WNBA Draft.

Transactions
February 5: The Mercury re-signed Jennifer Lacy and Jen Derevjanik.
February 21: The Mercury traded Sandora Irvin to the San Antonio Silver Stars for a second-round pick in the 2008 draft.
March 8: The Mercury re-signed free agent Penny Taylor.
March 20: The Mercury signed Adriana Moises.
April 4: The Mercury traded the draft rights to Lindsey Harding to the Minnesota Lynx in exchange for Tangela Smith.
April 5: The Mercury waived Kamila Vodichkova.
April 25: The Mercury waived Michelle Campbell and Jocelyn Penn.
April 26: The Mercury waived Charity Egenti and Yolanda Jones.
May 1: The Mercury waived Natalie Nakase.
May 10: The Mercury waived Chloe Kerr and Carrie Moore.
May 14: The Mercury waived Chrissy Givens.
May 17: The Mercury waived Leah Rush, Tyresa Smith and Mandisa Stevenson.
May 18: The Mercury waived Kwe Ryong Kim and Crystal Smith.
June 21: The Mercury waived Adriana Moises.
July 5: The Mercury signed Teana Miller.

Free agents

Additions

Subtractions

Roster
{| class="toccolours" style="font-size: 95%; width: 100%;"
|-
! colspan="2" style="background:indigo; color:#ff0; text-align:center;"| 2007 Phoenix Mercury Finals roster
|- style="background:crimson; color:#fff; text-align:center;"
! Players !! Coaches
|-
| valign="top" |
{| class="sortable" style="background:none; margin:0; width:100%;"
|-
! Pos. !! # !! Nat. !! Name !! Ht. !! Wt. !! From
|-

Season standings

Schedule

Regular season

Regular season statistics

Awards and honors
Cappie Pondexter was named the 2007 Finals MVP.

References

External links 
Mercury on Basketball Reference

Phoenix Mercury seasons
Phoenix
Phoenix Mercury
Western Conference (WNBA) championship seasons
Women's National Basketball Association championship seasons